Piotr Fijas (born 27 July 1958) is a Polish former ski jumper.

Career
Fijas won a bronze medal at the 1979 FIS Ski Flying World Championships in Planica, Yugoslavia (now Slovenia). 

He finished seventh on the individual normal hill at the 1984 Winter Olympics in Sarajevo, and scored three individual World Cup wins between 1980 and 1986, all in individual large hill competitions.

The last and all-time world record in parallel style
It was held for seven years and only after that period world record was officially discussed and recognized at FIS Autumn meeting '94 (as decided at FIS Congress in Rio de Janeiro), when ridiculous  rule established by World Cup founder Torbjørn Yggeseth, was lifted.

World Cup

Standings

Wins

Ski jumping world record
The last and all-time parallel style ski jumping world record in history.

References

External links

1958 births
Living people
Olympic ski jumpers of Poland
Polish male ski jumpers
Ski jumpers at the 1980 Winter Olympics
Ski jumpers at the 1984 Winter Olympics
Ski jumpers at the 1988 Winter Olympics
Sportspeople from Bielsko-Biała
20th-century Polish people